Maverick is the third single album by South Korean boy group The Boyz. It was released on November 1, 2021 through Cre.Ker Entertainment. The single album consists of three tracks, including the lead single "Maverick".

Background 
On November 1, The Boyz made their comeback with their third single album Maverick with the lead single of the same name.

Track listing

Charts

Weekly charts

Year-end charts

Certifications

Accolades

Release history

References 

2021 singles
Single albums
The Boyz (South Korean band) albums